Kanak Mal Katara is a current Member of Parliament from Banswara Lok Sabha constituency in Rajasthan. He is former member of Rajya Sabha and former cabinet minister in Government of Rajasthan.
He held the portfolios of Woman and Child Development, Tribal Area Development, GAD and was elected to Rajasthan Legislative Assembly from Sagwara in Dungarpur district. He is a leader of Bharatiya Janata Party.

References

External links 

Rajasthani politicians
Year of birth missing (living people)
Living people
Lok Sabha members from Rajasthan
People from Dungarpur district
India MPs 2019–present
Rajasthan MLAs 1998–2003
Rajasthan MLAs 2003–2008
Bharatiya Janata Party politicians from Rajasthan